pfsync is a computer protocol used to synchronise firewall states between machines running Packet Filter (PF) for high availability. It is used along with CARP to make sure a backup firewall has the same information as the main firewall. When the main machine in the firewall cluster dies, the backup machine is able to accept current connections without loss.

See also 
 OpenBSD
 PF (firewall)
 CARP
 Linux-HA
 Linux Virtual Server

References

External links 
 PF: Firewall Redundancy with CARP and pfsync (OpenBSD PF FAQ)
 pfsync(4) man-page in OpenBSD, FreeBSD and NetBSD 
 sys/net/if_pfsync.h in OpenBSD
 sys/net/if_pfsync.c in OpenBSD

Internet protocols
High-availability cluster computing
BSD software
OpenBSD
FreeBSD
NetBSD
Firewall software